This page is for Dafnonas, Xanthi. For other villages of the same name, see Dafnonas, Chios.

Dafnonas is a settlement in the municipality Xanthi in the Xanthi regional unit of Greece.

Populated places in Xanthi (regional unit)